Fernand Zago (27 February 1942 – 8 November 2022) was a French rugby union player who played as a prop. He appeared in two matches for the French national team in the 1963 Five Nations Championship, a 24 to 5 victory over Ireland and a 6 to five loss to England.

References

1942 births
2022 deaths
France international rugby union players
US Montauban players
Sportspeople from Haute-Garonne